William Thompson (August 1886 – 1933) was an English professional footballer who played as a forward in the Football League for West Bromwich Albion, Newport County, Middlesbrough and Hartlepools United.

Career statistics

References

1886 births
1933 deaths
English footballers
English Football League players
Southern Football League players
Brentford F.C. wartime guest players
Middlesbrough F.C. players
Morpeth Harriers F.C. players
West Bromwich Albion F.C. players
Rutherglen Glencairn F.C. players
Plymouth Argyle F.C. players
South Shields F.C. (1889) players
Newport County A.F.C. players
Hartlepool United F.C. players
Jarrow F.C. players
Association football outside forwards
Association football inside forwards
Queens Park Rangers F.C. players